In queueing theory, a discipline within the mathematical theory of probability, the G/M/1 queue represents the queue length in a system where interarrival times have a general (meaning arbitrary) distribution and service times for each job have an exponential distribution. The system is described in Kendall's notation where the G denotes a general distribution, M the exponential distribution for service times and the 1 that the model has a single server.

The arrivals of a G/M/1 queue are given by a renewal process. It is an extension of an M/M/1 queue, where this renewal process must specifically be a Poisson process (so that interarrival times have exponential distribution).

Models of this type can be solved by considering one of two M/G/1 queue dual systems, one proposed by Ramaswami and one by Bright.

Queue size at arrival times
Let  be a  queue with arrival times  that have interarrival distribution A. Define the size of the queue immediately before the nth arrival by the process . This is a discrete-time Markov chain with stochastic matrix:

where .

The Markov chain  has a stationary distribution if and only if the traffic intensity  is less than 1, in which case the unique such distribution is the geometric distribution with probability  of failure, where  is the smallest root of the equation .

In this case, under the assumption that the queue is first-in first-out (FIFO), a customer's waiting time W is distributed by:

Busy period

The busy period can be computed by using a duality between the G/M/1 model and M/G/1 queue generated by the Christmas tree transformation.

Response time

The response time is the amount of time a job spends in the system from the instant of arrival to the time they leave the system. A consistent and asymptotically normal estimator for the mean response time, can be computed as the fixed point of an empirical Laplace transform.

References

Single queueing nodes